Prionobutis is a genus of fishes in the family Butidae native to Borneo and Papua New Guinea.

Species
The recognized species in this genus are:
 Prionobutis dasyrhynchus (Günther, 1868)
 Prionobutis microps (M. C. W. Weber, 1907) (small-eyed loter)

References

Butidae